The Talamanca languages are a well-defined branch of Chibchan languages spoken in central–southern Costa Rica and northern Panama. They are:
Huetar (Güetar), Bribri (Talamanca), Cabécar (Talamanca), Chánguena, Teribe (Quequexque, Naso), and maybe Movere (Move).

References

Chibchan languages
Indigenous languages of Central America
Languages of Costa Rica
Languages of Panama